The electorate of Iraq went to the polls on 15 October 2005 to vote in a referendum on whether or not to ratify the proposed constitution of Iraq. After 10 days of counting votes, the country's electoral commission announced that the constitution had been approved by a wide margin nationwide. A number of mainly Sunni critics like future deputy prime minister Saleh al-Mutlaq alleged massive irregularities, saying that soldiers broke in to polling stations and changed votes to yes in the crucial province of Nineveh, which was expected by them to provide the third (and deciding) "no" vote.

Background and campaign
Article 61 of Iraq's Interim Constitution, in effect since 28 June 2004, laid down the rules for the approval of the proposed permanent constitution. The proposed constitution would have been approved in the referendum if both a majority of voters nationwide voted "yes" and there were no more than 2 of the country's 18 governorates where two-thirds of the voters voted "no." On 2 October 2005, the National Assembly weakened the second requirement such that it would only fail to be fulfilled if two-thirds of registered voters—rather than actual voters—in three governorates voted "no." Opponents of the Draft Constitution reacted angrily to this reinterpretation of Article 61 of the Interim Constitution. Critics had also pointed out that such an interpretation reads the term "voter" differently in both requirements; the first requirement is still simply fulfilled if a majority of actual voters nationwide votes yes. After much international criticism, the decision was reversed on 5 October.

The possibility of veto by supermajorities of three or more governorates was originally written into the interim constitution to ensure that the permanent constitution would be acceptable to Iraq's Kurdish minority. However, support for the constitution was weakest among Iraq's Sunni Arab community, and some observers thought that the Sunni vote would result in the constitution's rejection. While the exact ethnic distribution of the Iraqi population by governorate is unknown, because the country has not had an official census for 15 years, governorates that include substantial Sunni populations include Baghdad, Al Anbar, Salah ad Din, Nineveh and Diyala. In the event, Al Anbar, Saladin, and Nineveh all saw majorities vote against ratification, though the vote in Nineveh did not result in the two-thirds "no" supermajority required to scuttle the constitution.

The vote
Voting took place as planned on 15 October. All civilian cars were banned from streets due to heavy security. Attacks against polling stations were reported in Bagdad, with low casualties.  Initially, Iraqi election officials had hoped that results of the balloting would be made public by 19 October. On 17 October, however, election officials announced that questions concerning the turnout in some provinces required that the vote be audited, which delayed release of the final figures.  A sandstorm in central Iraq has also contributed to the delay. Although Sunni politician Saleh al-Mutlaq has alleged fraud, election monitors from the United Nations said that the vote "went well."

On 25 October, Electoral Commission officials released the final results, which indicated that the constitution had been approved. Overall, 79% of voters backed the charter and 21% opposed it. Of 18 governorates, only two recorded "No" votes greater than two thirds—one province short of a veto. Turnout in the referendum was 63%, commission officials had said previously.

With the approval of the constitution, elections for a permanent government must be held no later than 15 December 2005, with the new government assuming office no later than 31 December 2005. If the constitution had been rejected, the National Assembly would have been dissolved, and a new transitional government would have been elected to attempt to write another permanent constitution.

During this election, security detainees held by coalition forces and the Ministry of Interior were given the opportunity to vote. This is the first time in the modern history of the Middle East that detainees of this nature were allowed to vote in any election.

Results table

See also

Federalism in Iraq

References

External links
Iraq's Sunnis Register to Vote in Droves (The Washington Post, 8 September 2005)
UN condemns Iraq charter change (BBC News, 4 October 2005)
Iraqis vote on new constitution; few attacks Reuters October 15, 2005
The Iraqi Constitution: What Would Approval Really Mean? JURIST
Iraq Charter Seems Assured of Approval Associated Press October 16, 2005
Iraq result delay over fraud fear BBC October 17, 2005
 Iraq voters back new constitution BBC October 25, 2005
Soldier's firsthand photo essay of Baghdad's Referendum Vote on October 15th by Matthew Vea
Iraq's Constitutional Process II: An Opportunity Lost U.S. Institute of Peace Special Report, December 2005

2005 referendums
Constitutional referendum
Constitution of Iraq
Referendums in Iraq
Constitutional referendums
October 2005 events in Iraq